Pulchriphyllium bioculatum, Seychelles leaf insect, Javanese leaf insect, or Gray's leaf insect, is a leaf insect of the family Phylliidae native to tropical Asia as well as Madagascar, Mauritius and the Seychelles. It was first described by George Robert Gray in 1832 and was the first phasmid he discovered. Leaf insects have extremely flattened, irregularly shaped bodies, wings, and legs. They are called leaf insects because their large, leathery forewings have veins that look similar to the veins on the particular type of leaves they inhabit. Its scientific name bioculatum means "two-eyed" and refers to the two dots located on the abdomen just in this species.

Description

The insect has green, broad body and legs and frequently has spots. Both females and males occur in shades of green, yellow, and orange. Java leaf insects would be greenish or brownish as adults. The organism's forewings and camouflage are used for defense. The antennae of the females are very short, while those of the male are longer. The species also has hind wings which are used for flying by males, but are unused by females. The species molts 5–6 times in a lifetime. Females are heavy-bodied and flightless, and each lays about 500 eggs in a lifetime. The abdomen is narrower at the base, and the femur of the fore legs are dilated.

Ecology
They are slow-moving herbivores and rely on their camouflage and fore wings for defense from predators including birds, amphibians and reptiles.  The females live from 4 to 7 months and males from 3 weeks to 1 month.

Habitat and distribution
These leaf insects are found mainly in tropical areas and rainforests where adequate quantities of vegetation are available for consumption. It is widespread in Southeast Asia, in Borneo, China, India, Sri Lanka, Java, Malaysia, Singapore, and Sumatra. It is also found in Madagascar, Mauritius, and the Seychelles. However, the IUCN Red list considers it endemic to the Seychelles, the Asian records referring to other species.

Temperature does not strongly affect the species but will slow development. It is important that the temperature is not reduced below . Low humidity can cause stress and death.

Diet
As a herbivore Pulchriphyllium bioculatum mainly eats mango, guava, Nephelium lappaceum (Rambutan), and in captivity some accept Quercus (oak) and Rubus (dewberry, raspberry and blackberry) species.

A study was done in Sri Lanka, based on the leaf insect's diet. The specimens mainly fed on guava. Accordingly, the local name for the species in Sri Lanka is pera kolaya (guava leaf). In many places they are colloquially referred to on the basis of what they eat.

Reproduction and incubation

The females lay eggs in months.

However, many times the eggs laid are not fertilized due to parthenogenesis. This is a form of asexual reproduction found in females, where growth and development of embryos occurs without fertilization by a male. Eggs are oval or barrel-shaped, like seeds. Different types of oviposition occur in leaf insects. The eggs of this species are catapulted by a backward movement of the abdomen. In a study the ratio of the distance the egg was thrown and the body length of the insect was compared with some other species, which was 24–36.  If the eggs are fertilized, then it takes 3–4 months for incubation, otherwise it takes 6 months for unfertilized eggs. Unfertilized eggs hatch out with females only, while fertilized ones may be either male or female. The female lays about 100 eggs at intervals of a few days. The larvae are red at hatching but green within three to seven days. These hatch from eggs laid at a rate of three per day per female.

References

Notes

Bibliography

 'Stick and leaf insects' by J.T. Clark; Pages 13, 27, 30
 'Proceedings of the Academy of Natural Sciences (Vol. LXXXV, 1933)' Pg 411

Phylliidae
Phasmatodea of Asia
Insects of Seychelles
Insects described in 1832
Taxa named by George Robert Gray